Mushtaq Ahmad (28 August 1932 – 23 April 2011) was a field hockey striker from Pakistan. He was born in Amritsar, India. He won the gold medal in 1960 Summer Olympics. He scored against Australia in the first match of the Games. After the Olympics he was granted a transferral along with his family to move to the United Kingdom. He died in London, England aged 82 on 23 April 2011.

See also
Mushtaq Ahmad (field hockey, born 1956)

References

External links
 

Field hockey players at the 1960 Summer Olympics
Olympic field hockey players of Pakistan
Pakistani male field hockey players
1932 births
2011 deaths
Medalists at the 1960 Summer Olympics
Olympic gold medalists for Pakistan
Pakistani emigrants to England
Olympic medalists in field hockey
20th-century Pakistani people